The Vieux Lyon is the largest Renaissance district of Lyon. In 1964, Vieux-Lyon, the city's oldest district, became the first site in France to be protected under the Malraux law to protect France's cultural sites. Covering an area of 424 hectares between the Fourvière hill and the river Saône, it is one of Europe’s most extensive Renaissance neighborhoods. There are three distinct sections: Saint Jean, Saint Paul and Saint Georges. In 1998, Vieux Lyon was inscribed on the UNESCO World Heritage List along with other districts in Lyon because of its historical importance and architecture. 

The Saint Jean quarter in the Middle Ages was the focus of political and religious power. The Cathedral of St Jean, seat of the archbishop of Lyon (also known as the Primate of Gaul), is a good example of Gothic architecture. The Manécanterie adjoining the cathedral is one of Lyon's few extant Romanesque buildings. Formerly a choir school, it now houses the museum of the cathedral’s treasures. Saint Jean is also home to the Museum of Miniatures and Film Sets, located in a building that was the Golden Cross Inn in the 15th century.

The Saint-Paul section in the 15th and 16th centuries predominantly housed Italian banker-merchants. They moved into sumptuous urban residences here called hôtels particuliers. The Hôtel Bullioud and the Hôtel de Gadagne are two examples and the latter now houses the Lyon Historical Museum and the International Puppet Museum. The Loge du Change stands as testimony to the period when trade fairs made the city wealthy. The Saint Paul church, with its Romanesque lantern tower and its spire, mark the section’s northern extremity.

The Saint Georges section was home to silk weavers, who settled in the section beginning in the 16th century. They later moved to the Croix Rousse hill in the 19th century. In 1844, the architect Pierre Bossan rebuilt the St George's Church on the banks of the Saône in a neo-Gothic style. In the Middle Ages, when there were only a few parallel streets between the hill and the Saône, the first traboules were built. Derived from the Latin trans-ambulare, meaning to pass through, traboules are corridors through buildings and their courtyards, connecting one street directly with another. A large number of galleries and spiral staircases remain in the traboules.

Gallery

Saint-Paul 
Saint-Paul is the quarter surrounding Gare Saint-Paul, built in 1873, and the church of the same name. It is the scholastic pole of Vieux Lyon, with two main institutes, les Maristes et les Lazaristes. The church of Saint Paul itself was built for the first time in 549 and rebuilt in the 11th and 12th centuries.

See also 
History of Lyon

References 

5th arrondissement of Lyon
Quarters of Lyon
Tourist attractions in Lyon